The William H. Tyler House is a historic house in Lincoln, Nebraska. It was built in 1890 for William Henry Tyler, an immigrant from Wales who founded the W. H. Tyler Stone Company in Lincoln in 1881. It was designed in the Queen Anne and Richardsonian Romanesque styles by James Tyler, William's brother. It has been listed on the National Register of Historic Places since April 6, 1978.

References

		
National Register of Historic Places in Lincoln, Nebraska
Queen Anne architecture in Nebraska
Romanesque Revival architecture in Nebraska
Houses completed in 1890
1890 establishments in Nebraska